This is a list of notable poets from Nigeria.

A
 Chris Abani
 Chinua Achebe
 Catherine Obianuju Acholonu
 Bayo Adebowale
 Toyin Adewale-Gabriel
 Funso Aiyejina
 Tolu Ajayi
 Tolu Akinyemi
 Akilu Aliyu
 Abdulkareem Baba Aminu
 Nana Asma’u (1793–1864)
 Nnorom Azuonye
 Sueddie Agema

B
 Solomon Babalola
 Lindsay Barrett
 Philip Begho

C
 John Pepper Clark
 Chijioke Amu-Nnadi

D
 Delight Chilegide Olumati

E
 Michael Echeruo
 Amatoritsero Ede
 Edoheart

F
 Femi Fani-Kayode
 Peter Fatomilola

G
 Alhaji Garba Gashuwa
 Bakare Gbadamosi

H
 Helon Habila
 Obo Aba Hisanjani

I
 Tade Ipadeola

J 
 John Jea
 Onwuchekwa Jemie
 Joseph Awujoola

L 
Logan February

N
 Okey Ndibe
 Echezonachukwu Nduka
 Uche Nduka

O
 Godspower Oboido
 Odia Ofeimun
 Dr. Tanure Ojaide
 Gabriel Okara
 Diego Odoh Okenyodo
 Christopher Okigbo
 Ben Okri
 Olatubosun Oladapo
 Sam Oritsetimeyin Omatseye
 Dennis Osadebay
 Okinba Launko a.k.a. Femi Osofisan
 Niyi Osundare

R
 Remi Raji

S
 Ken Saro-Wiwa
 Mabel Segun
 Lola Shoneyin
 Wole Soyinka

U
 Uchechukwu Peter Umezurike
 Rems Umeasiegbu

V
 Mamman Jiya Vatsa
 Jumoke Verissimo

Nigeria
Poets